The Chiesa della Maestà or Church of her Majesty is a Roman Catholic church, dedicated to a Marian devotion, sited at Localita Parolito in San Severino Marche, region of Marche, Italy.

History
The church was built in 1473 at the site of an icon of the Virgin, it retains the original terracotta portal with beautiful floral decorations and two small side doors. Inside are 15th-century votive frescoes, painted by Lorenzo D'Alessandro.

References

15th-century Roman Catholic church buildings in Italy
Roman Catholic churches in San Severino Marche
Roman Catholic churches completed in 1473